A Different Ship is the third album from American indie rock band Here We Go Magic, released by Secretly Canadian in May 2012. As he did on the band's first two albums (Here We Go Magic and Pigeons), Luke Temple filled the dual role of singer and songwriter. The band also teamed with producer Nigel Godrich (Radiohead, Pavement) for the first time.

Reception

A Different Ship received positive reviews from critics. The album holds a score of 78/100 based on 29 reviews, indicating "generally favorable reviews."

Track listing

References

2012 albums
Here We Go Magic albums
Secretly Canadian albums
Albums produced by Nigel Godrich